Lilian Prunet (born February 15, 1978) is a French former professional ice hockey defenceman.

Prunet played in France's Ligue Magnus for Club des Sports de Megève, Hockey Club de Reims, Dragons de Rouen, Scorpions de Mulhouse and Yétis du Mont-Blanc. He also played in the 2004 IIHF World Championship for the France national team.

References

External links

1978 births
Living people
Brest Albatros Hockey players
Dragons de Rouen players
French ice hockey defencemen
Scorpions de Mulhouse players